William Vaughan Wilkins (March 6, 1890 – February 1959) was an English historical novelist and journalist. Wilkins was born and raised in England. Wilkins was interested in Welsh history, and some of his stories have Welsh settings, causing some writers to mistakenly describe Wilkins as Welsh.

Biography

Vaughan Wilkins was born in Camberwell, London. His father, William Henry Wilkins, was a clergyman (born in Nottingham in 1857)  and his mother, Charlotte Wilkins, née Law, a voice teacher (born in London). He married Mary Isabel Stanistreet and had two children. He spent some time working as a journalist for the Daily Express. Wilkins was noted for his novel And So - Victoria about Queen Victoria, which became a surprise bestseller in the United States. Fanfare for a Witch focuses on intrigue in the court of George II. Wilkins also wrote two "lost world" fantasy novels inspired by Celtic mythology, The City of Frozen Fire (1950) and Valley Beyond Time (1955).
His grave is in the churchyard in Farnsfield, Notts and states that his birthplace was Ross-on-Wye.

Bibliography
 Sidelights on Industrial Revolution (Jarrolds, 1925)
 And So – Victoria (Cape, 1937)
 Endless Prelude (Routledge, 1937)
 Looking Back To See Straight (Individualist Bookshop,1942)
 Seven Tempest (Cape, 1942)
 Being Met Together (Cape, 1944)
 After Bath, or, if you prefer, the Remarkable case of the flying hat… (Cape, 1945)
 Once Upon A Time, An Adventure (Cape, 1949)
 The City of Frozen Fire (Cape, 1950)
 [Introduces] Hermsprong; or, Man as he is not…by Robert Bage (Turnstile Press, 1951)
 A King Reluctant (Cape, 1952)
 Crown Without Sceptre (Cape, 1952)
 Fanfare for a Witch (Cape, 1954)
 Valley Beyond Time  (Cape, 1955)
 And So – Victoria (Revised edition, Pan, 1956)
 Lady of Paris (Cape, 1956)
 Dangerous Exile (Retitled edition of A King Reluctant, Pan, 1957)
 Husband for Victoria (Cape, 1958)

of which:

History
 Endless prelude: an historical anthology
 Sidelights on industrial evolution

For children
 After Bath or (if you prefer) The Remarkable Case of the Flying Hat

References

 IMDb. Biography for Vaughan Wilkins. (online). Available from: https://www.imdb.com/name/nm0929321/bio. [Accessed 28 July 2007].
 LibraryThing Beta Author: Vaughan Wilkins Available from: http://www.librarything.com/author/wilkinsvaughan. [Accessed 30 July 2007].

External links
 National Portrait Gallery

1959 deaths
1890 births
20th-century English novelists
English fantasy writers
English historical novelists
English novelists
Writers of historical fiction set in the early modern period
Writers of historical fiction set in the modern age